RWN may refer to:

 RWN, the FAA LID code for Arens Field, Winamac, Indiana
 RWN, the IATA code for Rivne International Airport, Rivne Oblast, Ukraine
 "Rapper Warrior Ninja", a recurring segment on The Eric Andre Show